Gigi Perreau (born February 6, 1941) is an American film and television actress.

Early years
The daughter of French-born Robert and Eleanor Child Perreau-Saussine, she was born Ghislaine Elizabeth Marie Thérèse Perreau-Saussine.

Career
Perreau achieved success as a child actress in a number of films. She got into the business quite by accident. Her older brother Gerald was trying out for the part of the title character's son in Madame Curie (1943). Because their mother could not find a babysitter, she took Gigi along. The two-year-old, who could speak French, got the (uncredited) part of Madame Curie's daughter Ève (while Gerald would have to wait a year to make his film debut in Passage to Marseille).

She also played the daughter of Claude Rains and Bette Davis's characters in the 1944 film Mr. Skeffington (1944).  In Shadow on the Wall (1950), she starred as the sole witness to a murder. As the "top child movie actress for 1951", the then ten-year-old was given the keys to the city of Pittsburgh by its mayor, and later  Pennsylvania governor, David L. Lawrence. She was the youngest person to be so honored. Perreau played the rebellious teen daughter of Fredric March in 1956's The Man in the Gray Flannel Suit. However, her film career lost momentum as she became an adult, so she turned to television.

In 1959, she played a friend of character Mary Stone (Shelley Fabares) on ABC's The Donna Reed Show, and had a supporting role in the sitcom The Betty Hutton Show on CBS, with her brother Gerald.  In 1960, Perreau and Robert Harland performed as Sara Lou and Lin Proctor, a young couple from the east who have eloped and are heading west, in the ABC western series Stagecoach West episode "The Land Beyond", with Wayne Rogers and Robert Bray.  Also in 1960, Perreau was cast as Julie Staunton in the episode "Flight from Terror" of the ABC adventure series The Islanders, set in the South Pacific. She was cast in two episodes, "Don Gringo" (1960) and "The Promise" (1961), of the Nick Adams ABC western series The Rebel.  In 1961, she played Mary Bettelheim in the episode "The Twelfth Hour" of the ABC/Warner Brothers television crime drama The Roaring 20s. She was cast in a recurring role on ABC's Follow the Sun series from 1961–1962 as a secretary, Katherine Ann "Kathy" Richards. She guest-starred on The Rifleman in 1960 and 1961. She made two guest appearances on Perry Mason: in 1958 as title character and defendant Doris Bannister in "The Case of the Desperate Daughter" and in 1964 as nurse Phyllis Clover in "The Case of the Sleepy Slayer." In 1964, she also co-starred as Lucy, a beleaguered homesteader, on an episode of Gunsmoke titled "Chicken". In 1970, she appeared on the sitcom The Brady Bunch in the episode "The Undergraduate", portraying a math teacher who becomes the object of puppy love by Greg Brady, one of her students. On 12/17/1974 she appeared as Iris Cooley on Adam-12

In the 2000s, she provided her voice in the animated films Fly Me to the Moon (2008), A Turtle's Tale: Sammy's Adventures (2010) and Crash: The Animated Movie (2017), and acted in Time Again (2011).

Affiliations
Perreau is an alumna of Immaculate Heart High School in Los Angeles and has taught drama classes there. As of 2010, she was a member of the board of directors of both the Donna Reed Foundation for the Performing Arts and the Will Geer Theatricum Botanicum and is the vice-president of the Drama Teachers Association of Southern California.

She was a drama teacher for Meghan Markle. She was a guest of ITN at Markle's wedding in 2018 and was recognised by her in the crowd.

Honors
On February 8, 1960, Perreau was awarded a star on the Hollywood Walk of Fame for her work in television.

On March 14, 1998, she was honored by the Young Artist Foundation with its Former Child Star "Lifetime Achievement" Award in recognition of her outstanding achievements within the entertainment industry as a child actress.

Personal life

Perreau's elder brother Gerald (stage name Peter Miles) and, to a lesser extent, her younger sisters Janine and Lauren, also had a measure of success in film and on television. Gigi and Janine portrayed sisters on screen in Week-End with Father (1951). Gigi and Gerald appeared together in the 1948 film Enchantment.

Perreau, 19, married 35-year-old Emil Frank Gallo, a business executive, in 1960; it was the first marriage for both parties. They had two children: Gina Maria Gallo Paris, a filmmaker, and Robert Anthony Gallo, a guitarist. They divorced in 1967.

She wed Gene Harve deRuelle in 1970, a production manager and son of director Harve Foster, with whom she had two additional children: Danielle deRuelle Bianco and Keith deRuelle. Her second marriage ended in 2000.

Complete filmography

References

Bibliography

 Best, Marc (1971). Those Endearing Young Charms: Child Performers of the Screen. South Brunswick and New York: Barnes & Co., pp. 209–214.

External links

 
 2019 Gigi Perreau interview, Mansfield News Journal, accessed August 30, 2019

1941 births
Living people
American child actresses
American people of French descent
American film actresses
American television actresses
20th-century American actresses
21st-century American actresses
Actresses from Los Angeles
Alumni of Immaculate Heart High School, Los Angeles